Phlebiporia is a fungal genus in the family Meruliaceae. It was proposed in 2013 by Chinese mycologists to contain the single species Phlebiporia bubalina, a crust fungus. This fungus has a monomitic hyphal system with simple septa, and dextrinoid and thick-walled generative hyphae. There are thin-walled quasi-binding hyphae in the subiculum (the mat-like layer of hyphae covering the substrate and supporting the fruit body). Phlebiporia makes spores that are small, smooth, and ellipsoid.

References

Taxa described in 2014
Meruliaceae
Monotypic Polyporales genera
Taxa named by Bao-Kai Cui
Taxa named by Yu-Cheng Dai